Alison or Allison Shaw may refer to:

People
Ali Shaw (Alison Shaw), Scottish television presenter
Alison Shaw, musician in Cranes
Allison K. Shaw (born 1984), American ecologist
Alison Shaw (rower) in 1993 World Rowing Championships
Alison Shaw, author of the 1998 book A Friend of the Family

Characters
Allison Shaw, character in the TV series Zoo
Alison Shaw, character in the novel Faces of Fear
Allison Shaw, character in the TV series The Last Ship